STV is an Australian television station licensed to and serving the regions surrounding Mildura, Victoria, owned and operated by the WIN Corporation and part of the WIN Television network. The station commenced transmissions on 27 November 1965.

History
During the 1970s, STV formed a programming and operational affiliation with GLV-10 (later GLV-8) in Traralgon and BCV-8 in Bendigo – a partnership expanded upon in 1982 with the establishment of a single on-air identity and programming schedule across the three stations, known originally as Southern Cross TV8 and later, the Southern Cross Network.

STV was brought by ENT Ltd. in 1989 and split from the Southern Cross Network shortly afterwards to join the VICTV Television Victoria network, which also encompassed GMV-6 Shepparton and BTV-6 Ballarat and following aggregation, extended its transmission area into Bendigo, Albury and Gippsland. The VIC TV network was sold to WIN Television in 1994. However, Mildura did not aggregate until 1 July 1997, when Prime Television launched to become a Seven Network affiliate while WIN Mildura became a dual Nine and Ten affiliate. On 30 June 2010, the station ceased broadcasting on analogue as part of the digital TV switchover in the Mildura area.

On 1 July 2016, as part of a wide national re-alignment of regional television, STV swapped affiliations with MDV switching from Nine Network to Network Ten, rebroadcasting a feed of ATV-10 from Melbourne with local ads.

On 1 July 2021, as part of a wide national re-alignment of regional television, STV swapped affiliations with MDV switching back from Network 10 to the Nine Network.

Programming
WIN Mildura broadcasts its programming from Channel Nine.

WIN News Sunraysia
For nearly 50 years, the station produced regional news bulletins from its Mildura studios. In later years, WIN News programs were presented from VTV's studios in Ballarat. WIN ceased its Sunraysia news operations in May 2015.

As a current Nine Network partner, it broadcasts WIN News Central Victoria, the national and Victorian Nine News editions and A Current Affair.

References

WIN Television
Television channels and stations established in 1965
Mildura